East Milford is a rural community of the Halifax Regional Municipality   in the Canadian province of Nova Scotia in the Shubenacadie Valley.

References
Explore HRM
Elmsvale on Destination Nova Scotia
 East Milford Mastodon

Communities in Halifax, Nova Scotia
General Service Areas in Nova Scotia